Maria-Cecilia Simone Kelly (born May 7, 1997), known professionally as Rico Nasty, is an American rapper, singer, and songwriter from Maryland. She rose to prominence in 2018 with singles such as "Smack a Bitch" and "Poppin".

While in high school, Rico Nasty began self-releasing content in 2014 and had released five solo mixtapes by late 2017. She gained a local, underground following with SoundCloud singles such as "iCarly" and "Hey Arnold". After gaining wider recognition in 2018, she signed to Atlantic Records where she released her sixth mixtape, Nasty (2018). This was followed by the collaborative mixtape Anger Management (2019) with long time associate Kenny Beats. Rico Nasty's debut studio album, Nightmare Vacation, was released in December 2020. Rico's seventh mixtape, Las Ruinas, was released on July 22, 2022.

Early life
Maria-Cecilia Simone Kelly was born an only child to a Puerto Rican mother and African-American father, also a rapper, who introduced her to rap music when she was a child. She was raised in various locations including Prince George's County, Maryland, New York, Virginia, and Washington, D.C. When she was 11, her mother moved to Palmer Park, Maryland where she was enrolled in a Baltimore boarding school for the sixth grade. She was expelled for smoking marijuana at 14 and transferred to Charles Herbert Flowers High School in Prince George's County where her music career began. The following year, her father was sent to prison and her parents divorced.

Career

2014–2017: Career beginnings and early mixtapes 
Rico started rapping in high school and released her first mixtape, Summer's Eve (2014), when she was in tenth grade at Charles Herbert Flowers High School. After graduating from high school, she started focusing on her music career and released two mixtapes in 2016: The Rico Story and Sugar Trap. Rico Nasty gained some prominence with her 2016 single "iCarly" which amassed over 500 thousand views on YouTube within months. She also released the single "Hey Arnold," which was later remixed featuring Atlanta rapper Lil Yachty. The duo would later link again in 2017 for the single "Mamacita" as part of The Fate of the Furious: The Album soundtrack.

In May 2017, Rico Nasty released her fourth mixtape, Tales of Tacobella, which is her earliest commercially available release . Kyann-Sian Williams of NME described the mixtape as "otherworldly and synth-heavy" and noted that the mixtape proved Rico's singing abilities. In June 2017, Rico released her single "Poppin" which quickly garnered over five million views on YouTube. The single was also featured on the HBO television series Insecure. Rico's fifth mixtape Sugar Trap 2 was released in October 2017 and featured an appearance from rapper Famous Dex. Critics of Rolling Stone listed the mixtape as one of the Best Rap Albums of 2017. Rico embarked on the Sugar Trap Tour in late 2017.

2018–2019: Nasty and Anger Management 

The singles "Smack A Bitch", "Poppin" and "Key Lime OG" gained prominence in early 2018; all of them meeting and exceeding 10 million YouTube views in that year. The former two songs additionally gained some popularity on the video-sharing platform TikTok after being used in various memes. "Smack A Bitch" was also ranked at No. 2 on The Fader's list of "The 100 Best Songs of 2018". The aforementioned influx of popularity helped Rico Nasty catch the attention of Atlantic Records, where she signed and released her sixth mixtape and major-label debut, Nasty, in June 2018. The mixtape was generally well received and landed on critics lists of publications such as Rolling Stone, Pitchfork, Stereogum, Noisey, Fact, and Spin, among several others. The mixtape's tracks, "Bitch I'm Nasty", "Countin' Up" and "Rage", were also ranked on lists of the best songs of 2018 by Paper, Highsnobiety and Pitchfork respectively. In late July, Rico Nasty embarked on her headlining The Nasty Tour to support the mixtape, playing twenty-seven different venues across North America over six weeks and completing the tour in early September.

Rico Nasty released the non-album singles and respective music videos for "Guap (LaLaLa)" in December 2019, as well as "Roof" in January 2019. She followed them up with several more non-album singles in early 2019 such as "Sandy", "Party Goin Dumb", "Big Dick Energy", "Hit That", and "Wanna Do". In April 2019, Rico Nasty and producer Kenny Beats supported singer Khalid during the opening night of the Free Spirit World Tour. Rico Nasty made the cover of The Fader for their Summer 2018 issue, and was the subject of a documentary produced by the publication titled Countin' Up.

In April 2019, Rico and producer Kenny Beats released the collaborative mixtape, Anger Management, as a surprise release. The mixtape received critical acclaim and made the critics' lists of several publications including Complex, Rolling Stone, Stereogum, Noisey, Billboard, NME, and Crack. Anger Management is arguably Rico Nasty's most successful release to date, both commercially and critically. In April 2019, Rico Nasty performed at Coachella Valley Music and Arts Festival for the first time in her career. To support the record, Rico embarked on her "Live in Europe" tour starting in late May and ending in mid July. In June 2019, XXL announced that Rico Nasty was part of their XXL Freshman Class of 2019. She performed at New York Fashion Week in September 2019 and subsequently released the single, "Fashion Week". Rico Nasty also performed as a headlining act at Rolling Loud in New York in October 2019.

2020: Nightmare Vacation

Rico Nasty provided the original song "My Little Alien" to the soundtrack for the 2020 film Scoob! in May 2020. In June 2020, her single "Smack a Bitch" (2017) was certified Gold by the Recording Industry Association of America for selling over 500,000 units in the United States. In June 2020, Rico Nasty also released the single, "Dirty", as part of the original soundtrack for the HBO television series Insecure. On August 7, 2020, Rico Nasty appeared alongside Colombian-American singer Kali Uchis on the song, "Aquí Yo Mando", which served as the lead single from Uchis' second studio album, Sin Miedo (del Amor y Otros Demonios) (2020).

On August 13, 2020, Rico Nasty released the single "iPhone" as the lead single of her debut studio album, Nightmare Vacation. On the same day, she announced that she would be collaborating with makeup brand Il Makiage on a new makeup line. Rico Nasty made the front cover of British music magazine NME in September 2020. Rico Nasty released "Own It" as the second single from Nightmare Vacation on September 17. In October 2020 she became an ambassador for Rihanna's lingerie brand Savage X Fenty, and made a cameo appearance in the Savage X Fenty Show: Vol 2. A few days later, Rico Nasty engaged in a social media campaign with children's TV mascot Hip Hop Harry and Atlantic Records to encourage the general public to vote in the 2020 United States presidential election. She released the song "Don't Like Me" featuring rappers Don Toliver and Gucci Mane as the third single off of Nightmare Vacation. In November 2020, "OHFR?" was released as the fourth single from the album, as Rico Nasty revealed its release date and album cover on the same day. She also released a visual trailer for the album in November 2020. Rico Nasty revealed the tracklist on December 1, before the album was officially released on December 4. The release of Nightmare Vacation coincided with the release of its fifth single, "STFU". In January 2021, Rico Nasty made her television debut when she performed "OHFR?" on The Tonight Show Starring Jimmy Fallon.

2021–present: Rx and Las Ruinas
On May 29, 2021, Rico Nasty announced her upcoming seventh mixtape, Rx,  on her social media platforms by revealing teaser art designed by Karli Fetz.

On June 17, 2021, Rico Nasty joined Little Bacon Bear for a casual, interview-style conversation presented by GRAMMY U. Rico disclosed more details about the anticipated mixtape, including that it spans seven tracks, employs Dylan Brady of 100 Gecs as a co-producer, and features Flo Milli and G Herbo.

In late 2021, Rico Nasty was the opening act for Playboi Carti's King Vamp Tour. In numerous cities on the tour, Rico Nasty was booed or had items thrown at her while she was on stage. On Twitter, she wrote that she needed at least two  hours a day to cry, and that she cried herself to sleep every night on the tour bus. In another Tweet, she wrote she wished she was dead.

Nasty's sophomore studio album, Las Ruinas, was released on July 22, 2022.

Artistry and public image

Genres and "sugar trap" 

Rico Nasty is known for performing hip hop music and trap music, particularly styles such as punk rap, trap metal, nu metal, pop-trap, SoundCloud rap, and rap rock. She is known for her "aggressive, cutthroat flow" as well as her "spiky style and raspy delivery". Rico Nasty told NME that she "resonate[s] with being a pop-punk princess."

Rico Nasty coined the term "sugar trap" early in her career and has used it as the title of her independent record label as well as two of her mixtapes. Musically, the term has simply been described as "bubbly, upbeat rap" as well as "singing and trap rapping". Lawrence Burney of Noisey noted that sugar trap is "markedly upbeat, bubbly, and self-loving, no matter her chosen delivery", while Kyann-Sian Williams of NME described it as a blend of "hardcore, gruff vocals" and "grungy hooks with softer, computerised beats". Rico Nasty has said that sugar trap has "soft, beautiful, melodic, flowy vibes" as well as elements of "trap music like Chicago drill music, Atlanta trap music, Memphis trap music, little bit of California trap music. I mix everything. If the sound catches my ear, I mix it." She has also described "sugar trap" metaphorically as "a headspace", "a way of fashion" and "a way of life". She also described the term as a "metaphorical place", saying "It's like when you have a really, really bad life and shit good starts happening and you don't know how to adapt to the good shit." In April 2018, Rico Nasty officially trademarked the term "sugar trap".

Influences 
Musically, Rico Nasty has cited Joan Jett, Avril Lavigne and Rihanna as her biggest influences. She has been named as an influence on Flo Milli, and ppcocaine.

Alter egos and appearance 
Rico Nasty's use of alter egos and personas in her music have varied throughout her career. These include "Tacobella" (a "vulnerable, sensitive persona"), and "Trap Lavigne", which is inspired by Avril Lavigne. Rico Nasty told NME that her personas are inspired by David Bowie, Tyler, the Creator, and Nicki Minaj."

Rico Nasty is known for her unique style in punk fashion. Kyle Munzenrieder of the American fashion magazine W has described her as a "maximalist fashion icon". Kyann-Sian Williams of NME wrote, "With her androgynous nature and outlandish style, Rico has been an icon for outcasts for years."

Reception 
In October 2019, Thomas Hobbs of Dazed wrote,

Personal life
At age 18, Rico Nasty gave birth to her son, Cameron  while in her senior year of high school. As she began gaining attention with her music, she quit her job as a hospital receptionist, while her manager, Malik Foxx, began buying production equipment. Rico Nasty revealed to The Fader that Foxx is "the only father figure that Cameron has ever known."

Discography

 Nightmare Vacation (2020)

Filmography

Short films

Concert tours
Headlining
 The Sugar Trap Tour (2017)
 The Nasty Tour (2018)
 Live in Europe (2019)
Supporting

 Free Spirit World Tour  (2019)
 Narcissist Tour  (2021)
 Blue Water Road Trip  (2022)

References

External links
 Official website
 
 
 

1997 births
African-American women rappers
Living people
Trap metal musicians
American musicians of Puerto Rican descent
Hispanic and Latino American rappers
21st-century American rappers
Rappers from Maryland
Southern hip hop musicians
Atlantic Records artists
People from Prince George's County, Maryland
People from Largo, Maryland
Hispanic and Latino American women singers
21st-century women rappers
21st-century African-American women singers
African-American women singer-songwriters
Trap musicians
Alternative hip hop musicians
Rap rock musicians
Singer-songwriters from Maryland
Rappers from Washington, D.C.
Singer-songwriters from Washington, D.C.